Ali Mehmet Celâl Şengör (born 24 March 1955) is a Turkish geologist. He is currently on the faculty at Istanbul Technical University, Department of Geological Engineering. 

Şengör is a (foreign) member of the American Philosophical Society, the United States National Academy of Sciences, the Russian Academy of Sciences and the Serbian Academy of Sciences and Arts. He is the second Turkish prominent professor who is elected as a member by the Russian Academy of Sciences after professor ordinarius Mehmet Fuat Köprülü. He was decorated with the coveted Gustav-Steinmann-Medaille — the highest distinction of the Geologische Vereinigung e.V.

Early life 
Celal Şengör was born on March 24, 1955 in Istanbul, to an immigrant family from Rumelia. After graduating from Robert College, he received his BS (1978), MS (1979) degrees and PhD degree from the State University of New York, Albany in 1982. He also writes a weekly popular science columns in the center-left daily Cumhuriyet. He is married and has one child, Asım Şengör.

Miscellaneous experience in scholarly matters
 1978 Co-reviser (for"Geosynclines and Tectonics" section) for the American Geological Institute Glossary of Geology, 2nd edition.
 1981 Consultative Committee Member, International Symposium on Qinghai-Xizang (Tibet) Plateau, Beijing, China 
 1982 Editorial Advisory board Member of the Proceedings of the International Symposium on Earthquake Prediction in the North Anatolian Fault Zone, İstanbul, 31 March – 5 April 1980. 
 1984 International Advisory Panel Member for Tübitak Natural History Museum and Science and Technology Museum (9–12 December 1984).
 1985 Co-convener of the NATO Advanced Study Institute on the Tectonic Evolution of the Tethyan Regions, Istanbul, 28 September – 2 October 1985. 
 1989 Co-convener of Symposium "Tethyan tectonostratigraphic terrane models tested". EUGV, 20–23 March 1989, Strasbourg 
 1989 Co-convener of symposium B9: "Stratigraphy and Evolution of the Tethyan Basins" International Geological Congress, Washington, D.C. 
 1989 Co-organizer of the Royal Society of London Discussion Meeting on Allochthonous Terranes, 8–9 November 1989, London. 
 1990 Co-organizer of the Eduard-SUESS-Symposium on the Development of Modern Geology and Austrian-Turkish relationships, 10 and 21 April 1990, İstanbul. 
 1991 Co-convener of Symposium "Subduction processes, strike-slip faulting and continental collision in the Tethyan orogenic assembly" EUG, 24–28 March, Strasbourg. 
 1992 Co-convener of Symposium I-3-24 "Tectonic evolution of Tethyan and adjacent areas" 29th Int. Geol. Congr., Kyoto, Japan, 28 August 1992 
 1996 Co-convener of two symposia in the 30th Int. Geol. Congress, Beijing, China, but was unable to attend. 
 1999 Co-convener of Symposium D06, "Inter-Relations between Palasexo-Tethys and Neotethys in Europe and Asia" EUG 10, 28 March-1 April, Strasbourg, pp. 189 ff.) 
 2002 Member of Wissenschaftliches Kommitee of Pangeo I, Austria, Erdwissenschaften in Österreich/Earth Sciences in Austria, 28. — 30. 6. 2002, Salzburg. 
 2009 Chairman of the 62nd Geological Kurultai [=Congress] of Turkey, 13–17 April, Ankara, Turkey

Membership in scientific societies
In 2012 he became a member of the German Academy of Sciences Leopoldina.

Distinguished lectures
 'The Tectonics of Asia': James Wright Memorial Lecture, Edinburgh Geological Society, 30 March 1988, Edinburgh.
 'Evolution of the Tethys': Annual Lecture of the Sylvester-Bradley Geological Society, 16 February 1990, Leicester. 
 'Turkic-type orogeny in the Altaids: Implications for the evolution of continental crust': The 34th Bennett Lecture, Geology Department, Leicester University, 8 March 1993 
 'Eduard Suess "Die Tethys" Vor 100 Jahrein und Heute': Festvortrag anläßlich der 100 jährigen Geschichte des Begriffs am 18. November 1993 ('Eduard Suess "The Tethys" 100 years ago and today': Celebration lecture on the occasion of the 100th anniversary of the "Tethys" concept, University of Vienna). 
 İhsan Ketin: Hayatı ve Eserleri (İhsan Ketin: His Life and Work): The First Ketin Lecture, Istanbul Technical University, İstanbul, 16 December 1996 
 'Tectonics of the Altaids in Asia, and the evolution of the continental crust' and 'Is the present the key to the past or is the past the key to the present: An ongoing debate in geology as a general problem in historical sciences': Lewis G. Weeks Lectures, University of Wisconsin-Madison, Department of Geology and Geophysics, 4 and 5 October 2001. 
 American Association of Petroleum Geologists Distinguished Lecturer, 9 to 19 March 2004, Eastern Europe (Budapest, Bratislava, Brno, Prag, Warsaw, Bucharest, Kiev) 
 'The Geology of the Middle East': The 6th Annual Robert E. Sheriff Dinner Lecture, University of Houston Geoscience Department and the University of Houston Geoscience Alumni Association, 15 November 2004.

Fossils named after Şengör
 Sengoerina argandi ALTINER, 1999: Altıner, D., 1999, Sengoerina argandi, n. gen., n. sp., and its position in the evolution of Late Permian biseriamminid foraminifers: Micropaleontology, v. 45, pp. 215–22.
 Dicapnuchosphaera sengori TEKİN, 1999: Tekin, U. K., 1999, Biostratigraphy and Systematics of Late Middle to Late Triassic Radiolarians from the Taurus Mountains and Ankara Region, Turkey: Geologisch-Paläontologische Mitteilungen Innsbruck, Sonderband 5, pp. 296 (see p. 75 and plate 5, figs. 3-6).
 Sengoerichthys ottoman JANVIER, CLÉMENT and CLOUTIER, 2007: Janvier, P., Clément, G. and Cloutier, R., 2007, A primitive megalichthyid fish (Sarcopterygii, Tetrapodomorpha) from the Upper Devonian of Turkey and its biogeographical implications: Geodiversitas, v. 29, pp. 249–268.

Controversies 
Celâl Şengör is vocal in his support of the Turkish military and the 1980 military coup in Turkey. In a very controversial interview published on the website of Radikal newspaper, Şengör argued that the root cause of Turkey's political problems was the lack of an aristocratic class, which would lead the society in cultural life and politics. According to Şengör, the Turkish military is the only elite class in society, and their refinement and education make them qualified for a rule. Most controversially, he expressed his unqualified approval of every policy of the military regime between 1980 and 1982 in Turkey by asserting that being forced to eat excrement should not be regarded as torture. Şengör later apologized for his remarks and claimed that he was misunderstood.

In September 2021, a video of Şengör surfaced in the social media in which he discussed an interaction with a female student. Several student groups viewed this interaction as sexual harassment. Istanbul Technical University's Women's Union criticized Şengör for sexually harassing his student. The Student Union also stated that they did not want Şengör to continue his duties and said, "We do not want ITU academician Celâl Şengör, who shamelessly told how he harassed his student, in our school. We will not host harassers and people who legitimize harassment in our schools." Upon this, the administration of the Istanbul Technical University started a disciplinary  investigation questioning all involved parties. The investigation concluded that there was no evidence for harassment, no complaint against Şengör, and that there was no need of a punitive action. Şengör himself has been often harassed in the social media by leftist and islamist groups because of his avowed opposition to Marxism, woke culture and his atheism.

In 2022, he equated the biblical figure Abraham to a figure in a fairy tale and doubted whether he even existed which led to a prosecution by the Turkish authorities.

Recognition 
1988 Honorary Doctorate from the University of Neuchâtel

Publications

Books
 1982 (with A. Miyashiro and K. Aki) Orogeny: J. Wiley & Sons, Chichester, 242 pp. 
 1984 The Cimmeride Orogenic System and the Tectonics of Eurasia: Geoloical Society of America Special Paper 195, xi+82 pp.
 1989 (Editor). Tectonic Evolution of the Tethyan Region: Kluwer Academic Publishers, Dordrecht. 
 1990 (Co-editor with J.F. Dewey, Ian G. Gass, G.B. Curry, and N.B.W. Harris) Allochthonous Terranes: Phil. Trans. Roy. Soc. London, v. 331, pp. 455–647.
 1992 Plate Tectonics and Orogeny - A Tethyan Perspective: Fu Dan University Press, Shanghai, 4 +2 + 182 pp. (in Chinese; this book is a combined translation of items 88 and 97 in the Papers section plus a preface added on 6 July 1991)
 1998 (with N. Görür, A. Okay, N. Özgül, O. Tüysüz, M. Sakınç, R. Akkök, E., Yiğitbaş, T. Genç, S. Örçen, T. Ercan, B. Akyürek, F. Şaroğlu) Türkiye'nin Triyas-Miyosen Paleocoğrafya Atlası, editör: Naci Görür (Triassic to Miocene Palaeogeographic Atlas of Turkey, Naci Görür, editor): İstanbul Teknik Üniversitesi, Maden Fakültesi, Jeoloji Mühendisliği Bölümü, Genel Jeoloji Anabilim Dalı TÜBİTAK—Global Tektonik Araştırma Ünitesi ve Maden Tetkik ve Arama Genel Müdürlüğü, Jeoloji Etütleri Dairesi, Ankara, [IV]+41pp.+30 pp. of maps and sections, oblong elephant folio.
  2001 Is the Present the Key to the Past or the Past the Key to the Present? James Hutton and Adam Smith versus Abraham Gottlob Werner and Karl Marx in Interpreting History: Geological Society of America Special Paper 355, x+51 pp.
  2001 (with X. Le Pichon and E. Demirbağ) Marine Atlas of the Sea of Marmara (Turkey) IFREMER, Paris, 13 pp. of Explanatory text, 11 foldout maps.
 2003 The Large Wavelength Deformations of the Lithosphere: Materials for a history of the evolution of thought from the earliest times to plate tectonics: Geological Society of America Memoir 196, xvii+347 pp.+ 3 folded plates in pocket
 2004 Yaşamın Evrimi Fikrinin Darwin Dönemi Sonuna Kadarki Tarihi (History of the Idea of the Evolution of Life to the End of Darwin's Period): İTÜ Yayınevi, İstanbul, 187 pp. 
 2005 Une Autre Histoire de la Tectonique: Leçons Inaugurales du Collège de France, Fayard, Paris, 79 pp. 
 2006 99 Sayfada İstanbul Depremi (The İstanbul Earthquake in 99 Pages): İş Bankası Kültür Yayınları, İstanbul, 99 pp.
 2009 (with S. Atayman) The Permian Extinction and the Tethys: An Exercise in Global Geology: Geological Society of America Special Paper 448, x+96 pp.
 2009 Globale Geologie und ihr Einfluss auf das Denken von Eduard Suess Der Katastrophismus Uniformitarianismus-Streit: Scripta Geo-Historica, v. 2, 181 pp.
 2009 (with B. A. Natal’in) Rifti Mira (uchebno-spavochnoye posobie): Geokart, Moskva, 187 pp. (Russian translation of item 166 below plus a preface)

References

External links

Academic curriculum vitae
Biography in Turkish

Turkish geologists
Turkish non-fiction writers
1955 births
Living people
University at Albany, SUNY alumni
Foreign associates of the National Academy of Sciences
Members of the Austrian Academy of Sciences
Foreign Members of the Russian Academy of Sciences
Academic staff of Istanbul Technical University
Recipients of TÜBİTAK Science Award
Robert College alumni
Cumhuriyet people
Turkish columnists
Scientists from Istanbul
Tectonicists
Turkish atheism activists
Turkish monarchists
Turkish secularists
METU Mustafa Parlar Foundation Science Award winners
Fellows of the Geological Society of America
Gustav-Steinmann-Medaille winners
Members of the German Academy of Sciences Leopoldina
Foreign Members of the Russian Academy of Natural Sciences